Shellyne Rodriguez (born 1977) is a visual artist, organizer, and professor based in the Bronx, New York City.

Education 
Rodriguez graduated with a BFA in Visual & Critical Studies from the School of Visual Arts in 2011 and an MFA in Fine Art from CUNY Hunter College in 2014.

Artistic practice 
In 2014, Rodriguez attended the Shandaken Project Residency in Catskills, NY. In 2015, she was the Artist-in-Residence in the Sculpture department at Hunter College, NY. In 2017, Rodriguez collaborated with MoMA to create the Night Studio program a free, six-week art class for NYC residents currently in the process of taking the TASC (Test Assessing Secondary Completion, formerly the GED). In 2018, Rodriguez was awarded the Percent for Art public sculpture commission to create a permanent public sculpture in the Bronx NY. Shellyne has stated that the sculpture will serve as "a monument to the people of the Bronx." In 2018, the Whitney released a video by Rodriguez where she responds and discusses Ja'Tovia Gary's film An Ecstatic Experience.

In 2019, Shellyne Rodriguez became the inaugural artist-in-residence at The Latinx Project, an initiative based at NYU that is dedicated to Latinx studies. While at the Latinx Project, Rodriguez curated a show with the curatorial team focused around the ideas of displacement and how it affects the Latinx population in New York. The show included pieces by Rodriguez, Alicia Grullón, and anti-gentrification group Mi Casa No es Su Casa.

Exhibition history 
Selected exhibition history:

 Siempre En La Calle, Calderón - October 28, 2021 to January 29 2022
 PELEA: Visual Responses to Spatial Precarity, Latinx Project, NYU - 2019 - Curator: Shellyne Rodriguez
 BRONX NOW - Bronx River Art Center - July 14 to September 8, 2018 - curated by Laura James and Eileen Walsh, who work under the name BXNYCreative
 Tamir Rice Photo Booth, Window Project, IMI Corona, Queens Museum, NY - 2016 - Curator: Prerana Reddy

Community organizing 
Shellyne is also a community organizer and an active member of the grassroots collective Take Back the Bronx. In March 2019, Rodriguez joined a group of latinx scholars, artists, and activists in penning and signing a letter to El Museo del Barrio demanding change at the East Harlem institution. Rodriguez is a member of Decolonize This Place and spoke at the Safariland protests at the Whitney Museum of American Art in May 2019.

Writing 
Rodriguez has written for multiple publications including Hyperallergic.

References

External links 
 The Latinx Project: Artist in Residence 2019 - Shellyne Rodriguez
 

Living people
1977 births